The Humber Lifeboat Station is located on Spurn Point in the East Riding of Yorkshire, England. The station is one of nine Royal National Lifeboat Institution (RNLI) lifeboat stations situated along the Yorkshire Coast and the most southerly of them all. It is the only lifeboat station in the United Kingdom that is staffed full-time by a professional RNLI crew; this is due to the waters around this part of the coast being so dangerous and the station's remoteness from the mainland.

A lifeboat station has been located on Spurn Point since 1810, the crews have been awarded 33 RNLI medals for gallantry. The current lifeboat is the Pride of the Humber, a  Lifeboat.

History
A lifeboat station was established in 1810 at Spurn Point with a crew supplied by Hull Trinity House. A decommissioned gun battery emplacement, last used in 1809, was requisitioned as the main lifeboat building and was also partly converted into the Life Boat House Hotel. The crew of the lifeboat were billeted in Kilnsea,  up the coast, until 1819 when cottages were built adjacent to the life boat house. The lifeboat House Hotel was owned and operated by the master of the crew. Apart from selling drink and provisions, the master made a side income from loading gravel and sand onto passing ships. The land and money to fund the operation had been supplied by the local lord of the manor. He petitioned Trinity House to take up the offer of the land and supply a lifeboat to use at Spurn. This they did, engaging Henry Greathead of South Shields in building a ship with ten oars.

In the early days of the rescue boat, the mood of the crew at Spurn was sullen as they were not paid too well and were at the mercy of the master who ran the inn to provide what food and drink they needed. Locals from up the coast would come to load ships with gravel and sand, which they did brandishing revolvers, threatening the crew members, who viewed the enterprise as taking away their self-sufficiency. In 1811, the master wrote to Trinity House to complain about this "Law of the Dunes" as he labelled it, to which they had no legal recourse, with as the nearest officials miles away.

In December 1823, a fierce storm worked the ropes loose on the lifeboat and it capsized. It was ruined and needed replacing. Something similar occurred 60 years later in 1883, again after a particularly stormy night, the crew discovered that their lifeboat had been loosed of its moorings during the storm. This time it was safe and was later found drifting off the island of Texel, off the coast of the Netherlands.

Between 1908 and 1911, the station came under the aegis of the Humber Conservancy Board, who argued that the lifeboat station and crew should be handed over to the RNLI. For their part, the RNLI were reluctant to take on the crew as they were paid, which went against its policy of having volunteers. Eventually, these issues were sorted out and the RNLI assumed control in 1911. In 1919, the first motorised boat, the Samuel Oakes was launched and in 1924, the station name was changed from Spurn Lifeboat to Humber Lifeboat.

The lifeboatmen were known to have taken advantage of the military railway between Spurn Point and Kilnsea as a means of quick transport up the coast to the village. They adapted a boat powered by wind to run along the line. When they met a military supply train travelling in the opposite direction, they were required to remove their sail wagon from the rails to allow the train to pass, not an easy task as the sail wagon had no working brake.

Due to the remoteness of the station, its restricted access (by road from the north) and the dangerous waters around this part of the east coast, the crew are on-site full time and are the only full-time paid RNLI crew in the United Kingdom. Up until 2012, the families of the crew lived in cottages on Spurn Head adjacent to the lifeboat station, but a decision was taken to have two crews revolving through a roster and so the families moved to new accommodation in Kilnsea. As the spit of land is prone to breaches, this was also viewed as in the best interests of the families of the crew members. Latterly, the families had been housed in cottages built in 1975 to replace the row of houses first built in 1819. These were demolished when the seven new houses were built at a cost of £100,000. The retaining wall built to hold the sea back from the domestic area still survives fulfilling its intended purpose. From August 2012 onwards, the two crews rotate through a shift of six days on and six days off.

The lifeboat is moored at the end of a pier that sets out into the Humber Estuary (westwards from Spurn Head) rather than a traditional launch down a ramp into the sea (which is on the eastern side of Spurn Head). This location has been described as being in the lee of bad weather, thereby providing a safer place to set off from. The crew have pushbikes to cycle down to the end of the pier and then use a boarding boat to get to the lifeboat. Despite some buildings being erected to launch the lifeboat, even from the early days, it was recognised of the difficulties in launching the boat from land, so it has been traditionally moored away from the coastline. A traditional lifeboat house with slipway was built in 1923 and used up until 1977, but it fell into disuse with bigger ships arriving that were better moored afloat. The slipway and lifeboat house were demolished in 1995.

The Humber Lifeboat has an operational area that covers the River Humber to Immingham Dock, south along the coastline to Skegness, northwards to Bridlington and up to a  out to sea. This overlaps with the  Lifeboat to the south and the  Lifeboat to the north and to other rescue agencies along the river. The  and  lifeboats are the next nearest all-weather lifeboats along the east coast.

Notable rescues

During the stations 200 year plus history, 33 RNLI gallantry medals have been awarded to the crews for their gallantry, including three gold, 13 silver and 17 bronze. Of these, Robert Cross, Coxswain for 31 years until 1943, won two gold, three silver and two bronze, as well as the George Medal.

Exact records of the first 100 years of rescues are patchy, but between 1810 and 1854, over 800 people had been rescued from the seas around Spurn Head. Between 1911 (when the Humber Lifeboat came under RNLI control) and December 2009, the lifeboat was launched 2,268 times saving over 790 lives in the process. At least three crew of the lifeboat were lost at sea during rescues in the 19th century.

 31 October 1850 - the brig Cumberland was wrecked off the east coast at Kilnsea during a gale. The captain of the Cumberland had already been drowned by the time the Spurn lifeboat arrived and the crew of eight were forced to climb into the rigging to survive. Four were rescued, but the next day the rescue of the other four necessitated the use of rocket lines. One of the Spurn Lifeboatmen, John Branton also was lost at sea.
19 November 1855 - the lifeboat capsized whilst assisting the schooner Zabuia Deverell; two of the crew drowned.
The crew of the City of Bradford IV put to sea at 0:15 am and after several attempts in extremely rough seas, all four crew jumped from the foundering ship onto the lifeboat, with the last person to jump being the master, who was clinging to the side of the ship as she listing 45 degrees to port. The lifeboat headed back to the safety of the Humber Estuary at 2:33 am.
The lifeboat Kenneth Thelwall was launched at 5:00 am and when she was  out from the site of the Fiona, they could see the fire on the other ship involved, the Phillips Oklahoma. 16 of the 25 crew were taken off the now heavily unstable Phillips Oklahoma onto the Humber lifeboat. The coxswain of the lifeboat, Brain Bevan, later described the fire as "The worst I have ever seen at sea."
The aircrew of one aircraft from RAF Laarbruch (ZA464) ejected, but only the pilot was recovered alive. The aircrew of the other aircraft were deemed to be dead after a search by the Humber lifeboat and other agencies, resulted in no-one being found.

Fleet

Notes

References

Sources

External links

Silent film clip of City of Bradford II being launched at Bridlington harbour

Lifeboat stations in Yorkshire
Buildings and structures in the East Riding of Yorkshire